The DJ 5 In The Mix is the fifth DJ mix compilation by German producer and remixer ATB, which was released on January 12, 2010. The DJ 5 is a triple-CD album, and includes songs by various DJs and producers, all mixed and compiled by ATB.

ATB has collaborated with many important artists for this release, including Ferry Corsten.

Track listing

Disc 1

 ATB - 9 PM Reloaded [Club Version] [Version]
 Fischerspooner - Supply & Demand
 Arty - Gentle Touch
 Alpha9 - Bliss [Alpha Club Mix]
 Dash Berlin  With Cerf, Mitiska & Jaren - Man on the Run
 Cor Fijneman  Feat. Melissa Mathes - Disappear [Carlos Sun Juan Remix]
 Jaco - Unreachable
 ATB  Pres. Flanders - Behind [EDX Ibiza Sunrise Remix]
 Simon Patterson - Different Feeling
 Estiva  - I Feel Fine [Piano Mix]
 Signalrunners - Meet Me In Montauk
 JPL - Waking Up With You
 DJ Tatana - Somebody [Leventina Remix]
 Mossy - Come With Me

Disc 2
 ATB - Gravity [2010 ATB Club Mix]
 Kyau & Albert   - I Love You [Cosmic Gate Remix]
 Steve Brian - Starlight
 Josh Gallahan - Shades of Love
 ATB, Tanneberger, Andre - L.A. Nights [ATB's 2010 Energy Club Mix]
 Cold Blue - Fever
 Akesson*  - Flavour Park
 ATB  &  Josh Gallahan - Mythology
 JPL - Summer Skin
 Ferry Tayle  &  Static Blue - L'Acrobat
 Henrik Christensen - Overseas
 Oliver Smith - Cirrus
 Adam Nickey - Callista
 Ronski Speed - Aural Slave [Thomas Datt Remix]
 Walsh & McAuley - Beyond Belief

Disc 3
 Dance 2 Trance - Hello San Francisco
 Zyon   - No Fate [Struggle Continuous Mix]
 Energy 52 - Cafe Del Mar [Three N One Remix]
 Chicane  Feat. Moya Brennan - Saltwater
 Hidden Logic  Pres. Luminary - Wasting
 Breakfast (3) - Dancing in the Moonlight
 Jam & Spoon - Stella
 Three Drives - Greece 2000
 Airwave - When Things Go Wrong
 Ferry Corsten  Pres. Moonman - Galaxia
 Andain - Beautiful Things [Gabriel & Dresden Unplugged Mix]
 Moby - Go
 Cosmic Baby - Liebe

ATB albums
DJ mix albums
2010 compilation albums